Kirkman Finlay III (born February 16, 1970) is an American politician. He is a former member of the South Carolina House of Representatives from the 75th District, serving since 2012. He is a member of the Republican Party. In the 2022 general election he was defeated by Democrat Heather Bauer.

His father, Kirkman Finlay Jr., was mayor of Columbia, South Carolina from 1978 to 1986.

Electoral history

References

Living people
1970 births
Republican Party members of the South Carolina House of Representatives
21st-century American politicians